Lester Tremayne (16 April 1913 – 19 December 2003) was an English actor.

Early life 
Born in Balham, London, he moved with his family at the age of four to Chicago, Illinois, where he began in community theater. His mother was Dolly Tremayne, a British actress. He danced as a vaudeville performer and worked as an amusement park barker. He began working in radio when he was 17 years old.

Tremayne studied Greek drama at Northwestern University and anthropology at Columbia University and the University of California, Los Angeles.

Career
In 1974, Tremayne commented, "I've been in more than 30 motion pictures, but it's from radio ... that most people remember me."

His radio career began in 1931, and during the 1930s and 1940s, Tremayne was often heard in more than one show per week. Replacing Don Ameche, he starred in The First Nighter Program from 1936 to 1942. He starred in The Adventures of the Thin Man and The Romance of Helen Trent during the 1940s. He also starred in the title role in The Falcon, and played detective Pat Abbott in Abbott Mysteries from 1946 to 1947. Tremayne was once named one of the three most distinctive voices on American radio. The other two were Bing Crosby and president Franklin D. Roosevelt.

In his later years, Tremayne was active in Pacific Pioneer Broadcasters as the group's historian and archivist. Those roles included interviewing people who were active in early radio to provide source material for researchers.

His film credits include A Man Called Peter, The Racket, The Angry Red Planet, The War of The Worlds, Say One for Me, North by Northwest, The Monolith Monsters, The Monster of Piedras Blancas, Fangs, and The Fortune Cookie.

Tremayne's Broadway credits include Detective Story (1949–1950) and Heads or Tails (1947).

Tremayne portrayed Billy Herbert in the television version of One Man's Family (1949–1955) and Inspector Richard Queen in The Further Adventures of Ellery Queen on NBC (1958–1959). He guest-starred in "The Life Story of Eve Drake and Howard Adams", a 1957 episode of the CBS situation comedy Mr. Adams and Eve.

In 1963, Tremayne appeared in the Perry Mason episode, "The Case of Constant Doyle", along with special guest attorney Bette Davis. He appeared in seven other episodes as various characters, such as Deputy District Attorney Stewart Linn in the 1960 episode, "The Case of the Madcap Modiste". In (1961), he played the title role of murder victim Willard Nesbitt in "The Case of the Angry Dead Man." In "The case of the Left-Handed Liar he played as murder victim Bernard Daniels. In 1966, he played murderer Harry Lannon in "The Case of the Unwelcome Well". In 1964, he played Ed Pierce in "The Case of the Ruinous Road".

In 1962, Tremayne portrayed the part of C.J. Hasler, a known thief in The Andy Griffith Show episode entitled, "Andy and Barney in the Big City" aired on 26 March 1962. In that show, he played the part of a cunning opportunist who happens onto off-duty Barney Fife who himself believes that he is stalking a jewel thief (Allan Melvin) who is in fact the house detective of the hotel where the story takes place.

In 1965, Tremayne played Mr. Clary in My Favorite Martian, season 2, episode 30, titled "006 3/4".

In 1969, he lent his vocal talents to the Walt Kelly/Chuck Jones animated television special The Pogo Special Birthday Special. Other voice contributors were June Foray and both Chuck Jones and Walt Kelly themselves.
 
Between 1974 and 1977, Tremayne appeared on the Saturday morning Shazam! television series based on the DC Comics superhero Captain Marvel. In the role of Mentor, Tremayne served as the literal mentor of the program's protagonist, young Billy Batson.

In 1987, Tremayne appeared on General Hospital as Edward Quartermaine for six months, the oldest character in that series, as a temporary replacement for David Lewis. He played the deceased Victor Lord for one month on One Life to Live during the 1987 Heaven storyline in which daughter Vicki Lord Buchanan (Erika Slezak) was reunited with most every character that had died on the show after a heart attack left her in purgatory.

Legacy
Tremayne was elected to the National Radio Hall of Fame in 1995.

Personal life
Tremayne was married four times. He did an afternoon talk show on WOR in 1949, The Tremaynes, with his second wife, Alice Reinhart, whom he married on 9 December 1945. When Tremayne died in 2003, he was married to his fourth wife, Joan.

Death
On 19 December 2003, Tremayne died of heart failure at Saint John's Health Center in Santa Monica, California, at the age of 90.

Filmography

The Racket (1951) as Harry Craig (Crime Commission chief investigator)
The Blue Veil (1951) as Joplin
Francis Goes to West Point (1952) as Col. Daniels
It Grows on Trees (1952) as Finlay Murchison
I Love Melvin (1953) as Mr. Henneman
Dream Wife (1953) as Ken Landwell
Tarzan and the She-Devil (1953) as Opening Off-Screen Narrator (voice, uncredited)
The War of the Worlds (1953) as Maj. Gen. Mann
Susan Slept Here (1954) as Harvey Butterworth, Mark's Lawyer
A Man Called Peter (1955) as Sen. Willis K. Harvey
The Lieutenant Wore Skirts (1956) as Henry 'Hank' Gaxton
Forbidden Planet (1956) as Narrator (voice, uncredited)
Bhowani Junction (1956) as Trailer Narrator (uncredited)
The Iron Petticoat (1956) as Trailer Narrator (voice, uncredited)
The Unguarded Moment (1956) as Mr. Pendleton
Everything but the Truth (1956) as Lawrence 'Larry' Everett
The Monolith Monsters (1957) as Martin Cochrane
The Perfect Furlough (1958) as Col. Leland
From the Earth to the Moon (1958) as Countdown Announcer (uncredited)
The Monster of Piedras Blancas (1959) as Dr. Sam Jorgenson
Count Your Blessings (1959) as Trailer Narrator (voice, uncredited)
Say One for Me (1959) as Harry LaMaise
North by Northwest (1959) as Auctioneer
The Angry Red Planet (1959) as Prof. Theodore Gettell
The Gallant Hours (1960) as Capt. Frank Enright
The Story of Ruth (1960) as Elimelech
Shoot Out at Big Sag (1962) as Chan Bartholomew
King Kong vs. Godzilla (1963) as Commander Roberts / General Shinzo / Narrator (voice, uncredited)
Mutiny on the Bounty (1962) as Trailer Narrator (voice, uncredited)
The Slime People (1963) as Norman Tolliver
Goldfinger (1964) as Radio Newsman (voice, uncredited)
Strange Bedfellows (1965) as Opening Off-Screen Narrator (uncredited)
Girl Happy (1965) as Opening Narrator (voice, uncredited)
Harum Scarum (1965) as Trailer Co-Narrator (voice, uncredited)
War of the Planets (1966) as Gen. Norton (English version, voice, uncredited)
The Fortune Cookie (1966) as Thompson
The Phantom Tollbooth (1970) as Humbug (voice)
Strawberries Need Rain (1970) as The Reaper
Oliver Twist (1974) as Fagin (voice)
Fangs (1974) as Snakey Bender
”The Dukes of Hazzard” (1982, S5 E6 “Big Daddy”) as Boss Hogg”s daddy Big Daddy credited)
Daffy Duck's Fantastic Island (1983) as The Well (voice)
Starchaser: The Legend of Orin (1985) as Arthur (voice)
The Naked Monster (2005) as General Mann (final film role)

References

Further reading
NPR: "Radio Legend Les Tremayne Dies" (26 December 2003)

External links

1913 births
2003 deaths
English male film actors
English male radio actors
English male television actors
English male voice actors
Male actors from London
People from Balham
British emigrants to the United States